Thee Shams (pronounced The Shams) was a garage rock band from Cincinnati, Ohio, consisting of Zachary Gabbard, Andrew Gabbard, Joey Sebaali, Chad Hardwick, Adam Wesley, Max Bender, and Keith Fox.  They were signed to Mississippi's Fat Possum Records and also released records on Shake It Records and several other small labels.  Many of Thee Shams' recordings were engineered by John Curley (of Afghan Whigs fame) at Ultrasuede Studios in Cincinnati.  The band played a large role in Cincinnati's garage rock scene until they broke up in 2006.

After Thee Shams broke up, the Gabbard brothers and Sebaali went on to form the Buffalo Killers, a band with a similar but "slightly more sophisticated" sound that was "hinted at" on Thee Shams' final album, Sign the Line.

Discography
Take Off (2001) — as "The Shams"
Please Yourself (2004)
Sign The Line (2005)

Singles &  EPs
You Got It/Your Lovin Man (2002) — 7" vinyl only
Thee Shams/The Greenhornes split EP (2004) — 7" vinyl only
Out Of My Mind/Plastic Factory (2004) — 7" vinyl only
Sings Be Coming Home & More (2004) — 7" vinyl only
Gotta Be Something (2005) — 7" vinyl only

References

Fat Possum Records artists
Musical groups from Cincinnati
American psychedelic rock music groups